Ja'Ron K. Smith (born July 29, 1982) is an American political advisor. He served as a Deputy Assistant to the President and deputy director of the Office of American Innovation for Donald Trump from April 2019 to November 2020. Smith had previously served in the administration as a Special Assistant to the President for Legislative Affairs from June 2018 to April 2019 and Special Assistant to the President for Domestic Policy from February to June 2018. He also served as the director of urban affairs and revitalization from the beginning of the Trump administration in January 2017.

Early life and education 
Smith is a native of Cleveland, Ohio. Smith's father worked in the construction industry during summers and as a snow-plower in the winters. Smith's mother was addicted to crack cocaine and left the family for three years before eventually getting off the drug and returning to work at a gas station.

Smith attended the Immaculate Conception School before being offered a football scholarship from St. Peter Chanel High School in Bedford, Ohio. During his high school football career, Smith was teammates with Bam Childress and Steve Cargile. Smith says he was recruited to play football by John Carroll University, but instead attended Howard University, studying Finance and Economics. Smith then earned a Master of Divinity from the Howard University Divinity School.

Career 
While in college, Smith worked as an intern for Congressman J. C. Watts. Smith also worked for South Carolina Senator Tim Scott and then-U.S. Rep. Mike Pence.

In August 2018, Smith's role in the White House was highlighted during questioning of Kellyanne Conway by Jonathan Karl on ABC's This Week regarding the number of Black people that the Trump administration has in senior roles. It emerged that Smith was the highest-ranking Black aide in the White House Office. CNN Digital Expansion ran a "who is" piece later that week.

On November 6, 2020, Smith announced in a statement posted on Twitter that he had left his post following the 2020 United States presidential election.

References 

Living people
Trump administration personnel
1982 births
American political consultants
People from Cleveland
African-American people
Howard University alumni
Ohio Republicans